Tilda-Neora is a small town and a municipality and a Tehsil Block in the outskirts of Raipur City in the Indian state of Chhattisgarh.

Demographics
 India census, Tilda-Neora had a population of 26,637. Males constitute 51% of the population and females 49%. Tilda-Neora has an average literacy rate of 63%, higher than the national average of 59.5%: male literacy is 72%, and female literacy is 53%. In Tilda-Neora, 16% of the population is under 6 years of age.
Tilda-Neora also famous as a wholesaler of cloth and kirana, and for several rice mills. Tons of rice is exported from here to Africa and other countries. Tilda-Neora is surrounded with more than four cement factories, century cement being the nearest.

Transport

Tilda Neora railway station is well connected by railways and roadways. It is the main station between Raipur and Bilaspur on Howrah−Mumbai Line.

References

External links
 http://www.mapsofindia.com/maps/chhattisgarh/tilda-newra.html

Cities and towns in Raipur district